Düsseldorf Baskets was a professional basketball club based in Düsseldorf, North Rhine-Westphalia, Germany.

History
The team was formed in 2008, when the Bayer company decided to dramatically decrease its sponsorship for its Bayer Giants Leverkusen. As a result, the Bayer Giants went down to Germany's Regional 1 (4th division) to restructure. The license for the Basketball Bundesliga was transferred to Düsseldorf, who chose to keep the name Giants. The tourism investment of Ozaltin Group, Gloria Hotels & Resorts became the main sponsor of Germany Beko Basketball League’s entrenched team Duesseldorf Giants. The name of the team was changed to "Gloria Giants" for the 2010-11 season. They ended on the 17th place in the 2009–10 season and relegated from the Bundesliga, but Gloria Hotels & Resorts invested more money in the club to get an immediate return to the first tier with a wild-card. The following season the team relegated again. In 2012 the club name was changed to Düsseldorf Baskets. After the 2012/2013 season the license of the team for playing in the second tier league in 2013/2014 was revoked by the ProA. Due to that the team did not take part in any competition in the 2013/2014 season. In March 2014 the team filed for bankruptcy.

Names
2008–2010: Düsseldorf Giants
2010–2012: Gloria Giants Düsseldorf
2012–2014: Düsseldorf Baskets

Results

Logos

References

External links
Team profile at eurobasket.com
Official website 

Basketball clubs in North Rhine-Westphalia
Basketball teams established in 2008
Basketball teams disestablished in 2014
2008 establishments in Germany
2014 disestablishments in Germany
Sport in Düsseldorf